Outlander is a television drama series based on the Outlander series of historical time travel novels by Diana Gabaldon. Developed by Ronald D. Moore and produced by Sony Pictures Television and Left Bank Pictures for Starz, the show premiered on August 9, 2014. It stars Caitríona Balfe as Claire Randall, a married former World War II nurse, later surgeon, who in 1946 finds herself transported back to the Scotland of 1743 where she meets and falls in love with the dashing Highland warrior Jamie Fraser (Sam Heughan) and becomes embroiled in the Jacobite risings.

 The seventh season will consist of 16 episodes and premiere in mid-2023. In January 2023, the series was renewed for a 10-episode eighth and final season.

Series overview

Episodes

Season 1 (2014–15)

Season 2 (2016)

Season 3 (2017)

Season 4 (2018–19)

Season 5 (2020)

Season 6 (2022)

Ratings

Notes

References

External links
 
 

Lists of American drama television series episodes
Lists of British drama television series episodes
Episodes